Marindin  may refer to:
 Francis Marindin (1838–1900), a colonel that served with the Royal Engineers
 USC&GS Marindin, a launch that served as a survey ship in the United States Coast and Geodetic Survey from 1919 to 1944